Ali Mohseni (also Romanized as ‘Alī Moḩsenī and ‘Alīmoḩsenī) is a village in Kheyrgu Rural District, Alamarvdasht District, Lamerd County, Fars Province, Iran. At the 2006 census, its population was 33, in 10 families.

References 

Populated places in Lamerd County